The Joseph Marien Stadium is a multi-use stadium located within Duden Park in the municipality of Forest in Brussels, Belgium.  It is currently used mostly for football matches and is the home ground of Royale Union Saint-Gilloise. The stadium holds 9,400 since 2018 and was opened in 1919. Its entrance is at one end of the Rue du Stade/Stadionstraat.

History

Early construction
In 1909, Royale Union Saint-Gilloise was offered a site in Duden Park in Forest, Brussels. Construction started in 1915, during World War I, and ended in 1919. On 14 September 1919, the stadium opened with a friendly game between Royale Union Saint-Gilloise and A.C. Milan.

1920 Summer Olympics
The stadium hosted some of the football events for the 1920 Summer Olympics.

1926 renovation

In 1926, the stadium was renovated after a design by architect Albert Callewaert. On this occasion, it was given an Art Deco facade that holds bas-reliefs by Oscar De Clercq.

References

Notes

External links

 Sports-reference.com 1920 Summer Olympics football.
 Stadiumguide.com profile

Sports venues completed in 1919
Venues of the 1920 Summer Olympics
Olympic football venues
Multi-purpose stadiums in Belgium
Football venues in Brussels
Forest, Belgium
Royale Union Saint-Gilloise